Pyalitsa is a rural locality (a selo) in Tersky District of Murmansk Oblast, Russia, located on the Kola Peninsula at a height of  above sea level. Population: 14 (2010 Census).

References

Notes

Sources

Rural localities in Murmansk Oblast